Saffold is a surname.  Notable people with the surname include:

 Benjamin F. Saffold (1826–1889), Alabama Supreme Court Justice
 Monroe Saffold Jr. (born 1948), American body builder
 Reuben Saffold (1788–1847), Chief Justice of the Supreme Court of Alabama
 Rodger Saffold (born 1988), American football player
 Saint Saffold (born 1944), American football player